= Rugodentus =

Scientific classification
- Kingdom: Animalia
- Phylum: Arthropoda
- Subphylum: Chelicerata
- Class: Arachnida
- Order: Scorpiones
- Superfamily: Scorpionoidea
- Family: Rugodentidae; Bastawade, Sureshan & Radhakrishnan, 2005
- Genus: Rugodentus; Bastawade, Sureshan & Radhakrishnan, 2005
- Species: R. keralaensis

Binomial name
- Rugodentus keralaensis Bastawade, Sureshan & Radhakrishnan, 2005

Genus of scorpions

Rugodentus is a monotypic genus of scorpions belonging to the monotypic family Rugodentidae. The only species is Rugodentus keralaensis.

The species is found in Kerala, India.
